Sally Riley  is an Australian filmmaker, writer, producer and media executive,  Head of Scripted Production at the Australian Broadcasting Corporation (ABC).

Early life and education
Riley, a Wiradjuri woman, grew up in Narromine, in the Central West of New South Wales After her father died when she was 16, she completed Year 12 at Narromine High School.

Riley took on a secretarial role at the local metalworks until she was 19, when she went on a three-year trip around Australia in a troop carrier with her then boyfriend, looking at Indigenous rock and cave paintings. After that she worked for a while as a liaison officer for Aboriginal land councils, before enrolling at the University of Wollongong (UOW) with the intention of becoming an actor.

She graduated from UOW with a Bachelor of Creative Arts (Theatre) in 1991, but changed course and went on to do the directing course at  the National Institute of Dramatic Art (NIDA) in Sydney, graduating in 1993. She then took up a traineeship at Film Australia, around 1994.

Career

Early career
Riley started out as an independent filmmaker, director and freelance writer.

She spent time as a Writer in Residence at  Central Australian Aboriginal Media Association (CAAMA) Television in Alice Springs, and as a director for the Melbourne Theatre Company and at Urban Theatre Projects in the Sydney suburb of Bankstown.

Screen Australia
In 2000 Riley was appointed head of the Indigenous Branch of the Australian Film Commission, which became the Indigenous Department of the new statutory organisation in 2008, Screen Australia. In her role as head of the department, she was responsible for the production of the award-winning feature film Samson and Delilah in 2009, directed by Warwick Thornton. She helped to launch the career of other Indigenous film professionals, such as Wayne Blair, Beck Cole and Darlene Johnson, and under her leadership, development support was provided for the acclaimed series First Australians (2008), by Rachel Perkins and Darren Dale. In this role she was determined to develop Indigenous producers and film crews, especially assistant directors and designers, to support the wealth of directing talent".

She also led the development of an industry handbook, Pathways & Protocols – a filmmaker's guide to working with Indigenous people, culture and concepts.

ABC
In 2010 Riley was appointed as the inaugural head of the Indigenous department at ABC Television, during this time acting as executive producer on the film Mabo (2012) and the TV series Redfern Now (2012–). Redfern Now was the first television drama "commissioned, written, acted and produced by Indigenous Australians", creating employment for many Indigenous creatives and winning the 2013 Silver Logie for Most Outstanding Drama Series. She was also responsible for bringing The Gods of Wheat Street, Cleverman, 8MMM, and The Warriors to the small screen when in this role.

In May 2016 Riley was appointed to the newly-created role of Head of Scripted Production, This position is responsible for all drama, comedy and Indigenous-related programs on ABC Television. In this role, ABC productions commissioned by Riley have included the series Stateless, Mystery Road, Total Control, Aftertaste, Rosehaven, Wakefield and The Newsreader.

Riley aims to identify projects which will attract new audiences to the ABC, using release strategies which lead to ABC iview, the ABC's online streaming platform. She has a strong focus to bringing greater diversity of all kinds (age, race, gender and ability) onto the screen and behind the productions.

Filmography

Short films
Riley wrote and directed several short films early in her career:
 Fly Peewee, Fly! (1995), one of six films in the series From Sand to Celluloid (1996), about a young boy teaching his white grandmother and Aboriginal father perspective. Nominated for an AWGIE Award in 1996.
 In Search of Archie (1998, 30 mins), documentary about writer Archie Weller trying to find proof of his Aboriginality.
Confessions of a Headhunter (2000), based on a short story by Archie Weller, who co-wrote the film script with Riley, examines conflict between the Noongar people around Perth and colonial culture. The drama tells the story of two men who seek revenge after the statue of their ancestor warrior Yagan was repeatedly decapitated. It won the AFI Award for Best Short Film in 2000, the script category of the Western Australian Premier's Book Awards in 2001, and was the winner of the Cinema Nova Award for Best Fiction Short Film at the Melbourne International Film Festival. It was also nominated for the Film Critics Circle of Australia's award for Best Australian Short Film, and the AFI Award for Best Screenplay.

Recognition
Riley was awarded the Public Service Medal in the 2008 Queen's Birthday Honours for her work in "developing initiatives that have increased the participation of Indigenous Australians in the film and television industries".

She was co-winner of the  Australian Directors Guild's 2011 Cecil Holmes Award (with Erica Glynn, sister of Warwick Thornton).

In 2016 she was listed as one of the FP Top 100 Global Thinkers.

In 2017, her alma mater the University of Wollongong awarded the Alumni Award for Social Impact to Riley, saying that she had "used her voice and talent as a filmmaker to advance representation of Indigenous culture globally, and drive a substantial shift in common perception – and misperception – of Indigenous life in Australia".

In 2020 Riley was invited to join the Academy of Motion Pictures Arts and Sciences, the governing body of the Oscars, based on "her outstanding contribution... in particular, in recognition of her drive to champion diverse storytelling in Australia, with an impact across the international landscape". This enables her to vote for the Oscars.

Riley has been recognised as being very influential and good at bringing good series to the small screen. Stateless and Mystery Road were selected for the Berlin Film Festival's Series section in 2020. Her advocacy for Aboriginal self-representation in the industry and work in developing initiatives to bring about increased participation by Indigenous artists, has earned respect.

Personal life
Riley has a son, Eli, born around 1999, and is divorced from his father. Eli is also a filmmaker.

References

External links 
 

Australian television producers
Living people
People from New South Wales
Indigenous Australian filmmakers
Wiradjuri people
Australian women film directors
Australian film directors
Australian women television producers
Australian Broadcasting Corporation people
Year of birth missing (living people)